Trge is a village in the municipality of Bugojno, Bosnia and Herzegovina. According to the 2013 Bosnian census, there are no inhabitants of Trge.

Demography

Historical Progression of Population
Demographic Progression

Progression of Population

Population distribution by nationality (1991)
In 1991, all 19 villagers were Serbian.

References

Populated places in Bugojno